WBNX-TV (channel 55) is an independent television station licensed to Akron, Ohio, United States, serving the Cleveland area. The station is owned by the Winston Broadcasting Network subsidiary of locally based Ernest Angley Ministries, operating as a for-profit arm of the company. WBNX-TV's studios are located on State Road in suburban Cuyahoga Falls, in a building which also houses Winston Broadcasting's television production facilities. The station's transmitter is located in Parma, Ohio.

WBNX is one of a few for-profit U.S. television stations owned by a religious institution (most U.S. TV stations owned by religious institutions are affiliated with non-profit religious broadcasting networks).

History

Early days

WBNX-TV first signed on the air on December 1, 1985, as a secular for-profit independent station. The WBNX call letters were previously used by a radio station in New York City on 1380 AM (now WKDM) until 1984. Before WBNX signed on, its owner Ernest Angley purchased fellow televangelist Rex Humbard's television production facilities in Cuyahoga Falls to start the new station, and later purchased Humbard's Cathedral of Tomorrow complex (the current Grace Cathedral). The unfinished concrete tower which still stands behind Grace Cathedral was originally intended to hold the transmission tower of WCOT, for which Humbard had previously held a construction permit on the channel 55 frequency (the station never made it to air, and its authorization was deleted by the Federal Communications Commission (FCC) in 1976). The concrete tower was never purchased or used by WBNX, but is owned by Krieger Communications and used for cellular phone transmissions.

The station, then branded as "WBNX TV55", carried a general entertainment format with classic dramas, westerns, low-budget films, syndicated game shows, and a twice daily airing of station owner Angley's religious talk/variety show The 90 and 9 Club. During this time, WBNX aimed its programming at family audiences (with the slogan "We are family and we show it!") and imposed censoring standards that were similar to that used by The Family Channel, Nick at Nite and other kids and teens' oriented cable channels. In November 1986 when cross-town WCLQ 61 was sold to the Home Shopping Network, WBNX picked up the cartoons and classic sitcoms previously on WCLQ. By 1988, WBNX gradually began running infomercials much of the broadcast day. By 1990, WBNX was running paid programming half the broadcast day, low budget syndicated programming about 1/4 of the day and religious shows a few hours a day.

WBNX's original transmitter was located on Snowville Road in Brecksville, Ohio, which was originally used by WKYC-TV (channel 3) in its earlier days. The old technology for the transmitter forced WBNX to broadcast its audio feed in monaural rather than in stereo. In 2000, WBNX built a new transmitter and tower in Parma, becoming the tallest television broadcast tower in the Cleveland market.

Fox Kids

WBNX moved to become a major player in Cleveland television in September 1994, when it overhauled its programming lineup to include a mix of classic sitcoms, movies and cartoons as well as a couple hours of religious shows each day; infomercials were also relegated to overnight time slots at that time. WBNX also acquired a few syndicated programs that got displaced from WJW (channel 8) and WOIO (channel 19) through an affiliation shakeup spurred by an agreement between then-Fox network parent News Corporation and New World Communications, in which the market's Fox affiliation shifted over to WJW (which had been affiliated with CBS for nearly 40 years) and the CBS affiliation went to WOIO (which had been a Fox charter affiliate since the network launched in October 1986).

When WJW and WOIO swapped networks on September 3, 1994, WBNX acquired the local rights to the Fox Kids programming block. Like other New World stations affected by the affiliation agreement, WJW decided to not air the Fox Kids block upon joining Fox, choosing instead to air newscasts and syndicated programs weekdays, and infomercials and local real estate programs on weekends. WBNX also inherited the northeast Ohio iteration of the Fox Kids Club from WOIO; under channel 55's stewardship, WBNX's Fox Kids Club grew into the largest Fox Kids Club.

At that same time, WJW reached a news share arrangement with WBNX that allowed the latter to air tape-delayed rebroadcasts of WJW's 10:00 p.m. newscast each night at 11:00 p.m.; WBNX continued to air these rebroadcasts until September 1996. The station also expanded its distribution, increasing its carriage on local cable providers throughout northeast Ohio (including within the adjacent Youngstown market). Channel 55's programming lineup during this period included more contemporary children's programs, sitcoms, drama series and movies; in addition, WBNX's content standards adapted to contractually airing syndicated programs containing profanity, sexual content and violence as is (with the only editing being that made by distributors to fit designated running times and to censor content not compliant with FCC decency standards). These changes would boost the station, with WBNX eventually surpassing WUAB in the ratings.

WB affiliation

On September 1, 1997, WBNX-TV took over as the Cleveland-area affiliate of The WB Television Network, assuming the rights from WUAB-TV (channel 43). The station, accordingly, changed its branding to "WB 55". The WB affiliation also resulted in WBNX adding the Kids' WB lineup, so with having both Fox Kids and Kids' WB, channel 55 promoted themselves at that time as being "Cleveland's Kids Superstation".

After becoming a WB affiliate, WBNX-TV continued to grow and eventually took the overall ratings lead above WUAB by 2004; WBNX consistently ranked in the top 11 of all WB affiliates in the country and was the #1 WB affiliate in overall ratings among the 19 largest television markets during the November 2005 sweeps ratings period. In 1998, WBNX approached Cleveland late night icon The Ghoul (portrayed by Ron Sweed) to host the station's Friday night (later on Sunday nights, towards the end of the program's run) movie, until WBNX discontinued its relationship with Sweed in 2004. In September 2003, the station changed its on-air branding to "WBNX-TV, Cleveland's WB," de-emphasizing the station's Channel 55 allocation.

CW affiliation

On January 24, 2006, UPN parent company CBS Corporation and WB network parent Time Warner announced that they would dissolve the two networks to create The CW Television Network, a joint venture between the two media companies that initially featured programs from its two predecessor networks as well as original first-run series developed for The CW. Nearly one month after the CW launch announcement, on February 22, 2006, News Corporation announced the launch of MyNetworkTV, a network operated by Fox Television Stations and its syndication division Twentieth Television that was created to primarily serve as a network programming option (in lieu of converting to a general entertainment independent format) for UPN and WB stations that were left out of The CW's affiliation deals. Following the announcement, both WBNX and WUAB were in the running to become Cleveland's affiliate of the new network.

On March 1, in a joint announcement by CBS Corporation and the Winston Broadcasting Network, WBNX was confirmed as The CW's Cleveland affiliate. Since the network chose its charter stations based on which of them among The WB and UPN's respective affiliate bodies was the highest-rated in each market, WBNX was chosen to join The CW over WUAB as it had been the higher-rated of the two stations at the time of the agreement's signing. Six days later on March 7, as part of an affiliation agreement that included two other Raycom-owned stations, WUAB was confirmed to be the Cleveland market's MyNetworkTV affiliate. WBNX remained a WB affiliate until the network ceased operations on September 17, 2006; when the station affiliated with The CW upon that network's debut on September 18, WBNX began branding as "WBNX, The CW," and adopted a new wordmark logo consisting solely of the WBNX-TV call letter and the CW network logo design.

On April 30, 2007, WBNX began broadcasting CW network programming in high definition and 5.1 stereo surround sound.

Return to independence
On July 11, 2018, Raycom Media and CBS Corporation announced that it signed a long-term deal in which WUAB would become the CW affiliate in Cleveland, with WBNX 55.1 becoming independent, effective July 16. The last CW network program to air on WBNX was Chicken Soup for the Soul's Hidden Heroes (part of the network's One Magnificent Morning block) at 10:30 a.m. ET on July 14. WBNX formally became an independent station on July 16, with CW network programming, consisting of one hour daytime and two hours nightly and Saturday mornings, being replaced with syndicated programs already on channel 55's schedule. WBNX continues its affiliation with Movies! and Heroes & Icons on its third and fourth subchannels.

Subchannel history

WBNX-DT2

On October 11, 2010, WBNX's second digital subchannel debuted as an independent station (branded as The Happy Channel) airing religious/family-oriented programming, such as Ernest Angley Ministries-produced programs such as The 90 & 9 Club, The Ernest Angley Hour and the gospel music series Sing, Sing, Sing, Come on Let's Sing, along with other select family programs. On January 1, 2022, channel 55.2 switched to the classic game show network Buzzr (though a small amount of religious programing remains on the schedule, preempting a few game shows).

WBNX-DT3
On March 20, 2012, WBNX activated a new subchannel, which six days later became the new Cleveland affiliate of This TV, which had previously been carried on WUAB until that station's affiliation contract with the network expired. On March 23, 2015, WBNX replaced This TV with the Movies! network.

WBNX-DT4
In November 2015, it was announced that WBNX would become an affiliate of the Heroes & Icons network. The network is carried on 55.4, which was activated on December 30, 2015.

WBNX-DT5 & DT6
In November 2018, it was announced that WBNX would become an affiliate for both Start TV and Decades on 55.5 and 55.6, respectively. Both channels were launched on December 1, 2018. On November 1, 2022, Decades moved over to WOCV-CD 35.1, which was purchased by Weigel Broadcasting back in June. With no replacement network lined up, 55.6 was deactivated.

Programming
Syndicated programs broadcast by WBNX include The Neighborhood, Rachael Ray, Divorce Court, Family Feud, The Jennifer Hudson Show, 9-1-1, Seal Team, The King of Queens, Young Sheldon, You Bet Your Life, The Goldbergs, and Last Man Standing.

Notable alumni
 Ernest Angley
 Ron Sweed (The Ghoul)

Technical information

Subchannels
The station's digital signal is multiplexed:

Analog-to-digital conversion
WBNX-TV shut down its analog signal, over UHF channel 55, on June 12, 2009, the official date in which full-power television stations in the United States transitioned from analog to digital broadcasts under federal mandate. The station's digital signal continued to broadcast on its pre-transition UHF channel 30. Through the use of PSIP, digital television receivers display the station's virtual channel as its former UHF analog channel 55, which was among the high band UHF channels (52-69) that were removed from broadcasting use as a result of the transition.

References

External links

Cleveland.ThisTV.com - Official This TV Cleveland website

Television channels and stations established in 1985
1985 establishments in Ohio
BNX-TV
Independent television stations in the United States
Buzzr affiliates
Movies! affiliates
Heroes & Icons affiliates
Start TV affiliates